Ty Rattie (born February 5, 1993) is a Canadian professional ice hockey forward who is currently playing for Linköping HC of the Swedish Hockey League (SHL).

Playing career
In June 2011, the St. Louis Blues made Rattie their first draft pick and the 32nd overall in the 2011 NHL Entry Draft. He was ranked 17th among draft eligible prospects by Central Scouting. Blues' scouting director Bill Armstrong stated that he was "someone that we liked because of his high skill level. Obviously, he's got some work to do as far as his strength, but he has been able to put up points his whole life at every level." Rattie was the first draft pick Armstrong made as the Blues' scouting director.

Rattie was raised in Airdrie, Alberta. The Winterhawks made Rattie the 2nd overall selection in the 2008 WHL Bantam Draft, behind only Ryan Nugent-Hopkins, who was drafted first overall in the 2011 NHL Entry Draft. During the Winterhawks 2010–11 season, Rattie had 28 goals and 51 assists in 67 games; he was a playoff scoring leader with 22 points (9 goals, 13 assists) and "led Portland with a plus-11 rating in 21 playoff games" as they reached the WHL finals.

In 2011–12, Rattie was named Canadian Hockey League player of the week for the week of November 21 to November 27.  He was also named WHL player of the month for November, for scoring 16 goals and 28 points in 11 games. In the 2012–13 WHL season, after the Winterhawks won the WHL championship, Rattie was awarded the airBC Trophy after being named the 2013 WHL Playoff MVP.

He made his NHL debut with the St. Louis Blues on April 11, 2014, against the Dallas Stars. During the 2015–16 season, Rattie scored his first NHL goal on January 12, 2016 against the New Jersey Devils.

In the following 2016–17 season, Rattie made the Blues opening night roster out of training camp. After playing in just 4 games with the Blues through to the new year, Rattie was placed on waivers for the first time on January 3, 2017. On the following day, Rattie was claimed off waivers by the Carolina Hurricanes. Over the following month, Rattie proceeded to play in just 5 games with the Hurricanes recording 2 assists. On February 19, he was re-claimed by the Blues off waivers. He was immediately reassigned to the Wolves.

On July 1, 2017, Rattie signed a one-year, two-way contract with the Edmonton Oilers after he was not tendered a qualifying offer from the Blues. On April 14, 2018, Rattie signed a one-year contract extension with the Oilers.

On January 21, 2019, Rattie was placed on waivers along with Ryan Spooner.

On June 25, 2019, Rattie was not tendered a qualifying offer from the Oilers, releasing him as a free agent. He joined former Oilers executive and newly installed head coach Craig MacTavish in signing a one-year contract abroad with Russian club, Lokomotiv Yaroslavl of the KHL, on July 10, 2019. In the 2019–20 season, Rattie made a slow transition to the KHL, collecting 3 goals through his first 16 games. With the dismissal Craig McTavish as head coach, Rattie soon left Lokomotiv as he was traded to Torpedo Nizhny Novgorod on October 29, 2019. He regained his scoring touch with Torpedo, finishing the season with 25 points in 36 games.

Career statistics

Regular season and playoffs

International

Awards and honours

References

External links
 

1993 births
Living people
Ässät players
Bakersfield Condors players
Brooks Bandits players
Canadian ice hockey right wingers
Carolina Hurricanes players
Chicago Wolves players
Edmonton Oilers players
Linköping HC players
Lokomotiv Yaroslavl players
People from Airdrie, Alberta
Portland Winterhawks players
Ice hockey people from Calgary
St. Louis Blues draft picks
St. Louis Blues players
Timrå IK players
Torpedo Nizhny Novgorod players